Bachtiar Chamsyah was born at Sigli, Aceh on December 31, 1945. He is a politician in the United Development Party (PPP) and Indonesian government minister under Yudhoyono presidency. He gained bachelor's degree at Faculty of Economic, Medan Area University.

References
 Tokohindonesia.com 

1945 births
Politicians from Aceh
Social affairs ministers of Indonesia
Indonesian Muslims
Living people
Minangkabau people
People from Sigli
United Development Party politicians